The Sri Komaram Bheem Project   is a Medium Reservoir has been built across Peddavagu River, a tributary of the Pranahita River. It is located at Ada village, Asifabad Mandal,   Komaram Bheem district, Telangana.

The project named after Komaram Bheem (Telugu:కొమరం భీం 22 October 1901 – 19 October 1940), was a tribal leader who fought against the Asaf Jahi Dynasty for the liberation of Hyderabad State. Komaram Bheem openly fought against the ruling Nizam government in a guerrilla campaign. He defied courts, laws, and any other form of Nizam authority, living off the sustenance of the forest. He took up arms against Nizam Nawab's soldiers, and fought Babi Jhari until his last breath.

This Project proposed to supply water to Komaram Bheem, Wankidi, Kagaznagar, and Sirpur mandals more than 45,000 in acres. But currently, the project is providing irrigation water to about 20,000 acres under its left canal 35 km. Right canal will provide irrigation water to about another 25000 acres.

See also

 Godavari River Basin Irrigation Projects
 Pranahita Chevella lift irrigation scheme
 Alisagar lift irrigation scheme
 Sripada Yellampalli project
 Lower Manair Dam
 Sriram Sagar Project
 Nizamsagar
 Icchampally Project
 Kaddam Project

References 

Komaram Bheem district
Reservoirs in Telangana
Irrigation in Telangana